The Order of the Ladies of the Cord (French: L’Ordre des Dames chevalières de la Cordelière" or "Ordre de la Cordelière"), was a ladies order founded by the French queen Anne of Brittany in 1498. This rope with knots had been added by her step-grandfather Francis I, Duke of Brittany to his arms in honor of St. Francis its patron saint and her father Francis II, Duke of Brittany had continued the emblem. The order was founded after the death of her husband king Charles VIII. The choice of name is not clear. Some sources speak of the node in the Scourge of the Savior, others from the cord of the sacred Francis of Assisi and still others of deliverance from the pressing duty of the unfortunate and involuntary marriage of Charles and Anna.

The symbol of the belt cord was also used in manuscript ordered by Anne of Brittany, for example, in the prayer book that let make between 1492 and 1495 for her son, Charles-Orland, the Dauphin.

The motto of the order was "J'ay le corps délié" ("I have the body untied").

Ackermann writes that the later French habit of drawing cords around the arm of a French noble widow, a so-called Cordelière, can be brought back to the symbol of this order and mentions this order as a historical order of France.

References 
 Laurent Hablot, « Pour en finir – ou pour commencer ! – avec l'ordre de la Cordelière »; in Pour en finir avec Anne de Bretagne ? Actes de la journée d'étude organisée aux Archives départementales de la Loire-Atlantique le 25 mai 2002, ed. Dominique La Page (Nantes, 2004): 47–70. 
 Gustav Adolph Ackermann, " Ordensbuch, Sämtlicher in Europa blühender und erloschener Orden und Ehrenzeichen ". Annaberg, 1855, p 211 n°94. "Orden der Damen vom Strich" or "Orden der gegürteten Damen" (Order of the belted Ladies) - Google Books (Former orders of France : p. 205-214)

Orders of chivalry of France
Orders of chivalry for women